Gökkale is an ancient  villa rustica in Silifke district of Mersin Province, Turkey

Geography
Imamlı can be reached via a 15 km (9.3 mi) road from Atakent which is on Turkish state highway . The  - road from İmamlı to Gökkale is not accessible by motor vehicles. But there is a footpath which at times coincides with a Roman road.

History
Gökkale literally means "Skycastle". But actually it was a residence. Gökkale is situated in a region which was once called Cilicia Trachaea (Rugged Cilicia). This region was famous for olive production and there were vast farms during the Roman Empire and early Byzantine Empire eras. Villa rusticas were residences of wealthy farm owners.

Building
The building with orthogonal masonry has six rooms. The windows are supported by vaults. There is a big cistern under the front yard of the building. There are two sarcophagi, the ruins of an olive press and a mill around the building.

Trivia
In 1949 the building was temporarily used as a village school.

References

Silifke District
Archaeological sites in Mersin Province, Turkey
Villa rustica
Olba territorium